Albert Wagner may refer to:

 Albert Wagner (architect) (1848–1898), architect from Germany who worked in New York City
 Albert Wagner (veteran) (1899–2007), veteran of the First World War
 Albert C. Wagner (1911–1987), director of the New Jersey Department of Corrections

See also 
 Butts Wagner (1871–1928), American baseball player